5/4 may refer to:
 May 4 (month-day date notation)
 5 April (day-month date notation)
, a time signature containing five quarter notes per measure, see quintuple meter
Just major third
"5/4", a song (with the above time signature) by Sunny Day Real Estate from their 1995 album Sunny Day Real Estate
"5/4" (song), a song by Gorillaz from their 2001 album Gorillaz
"5/4", an instrumental song by Rammstein from their 2002 single Mutter
 Five-quarter, or ″, a common lumber dimension